Roseville is a village in Muskingum and Perry counties in the U.S. state of Ohio, along Moxahala Creek. The population was 1,852 at the 2010 census. Roseville is served by a branch of the Muskingum County Library System.

History
Roseville was laid out in 1812 by Ezekiel Rose. It was initially named New Milford, but the name had been changed to Roseville by the time a post office was applied for in 1830. By 1833, Roseville had a gristmill and saw mill. Roseville was incorporated in 1840, with Dr. James Little elected as the first mayor.

The Roseville area was noted for its pottery production. The Roseville Pottery Company operated from around 1890 to 1954, and was a premiere producer of art pottery in the early 20th century. The Ransbottom Pottery Company was founded in Roseville in 1900, and later merged with Robinson Clay Products Company to become Robinson-Ransbottom Pottery Company; Robinson-Ransbottom ceased operations in 2005. The Ohio Ceramic Center, a pottery museum, is located just south of Roseville along State Route 93.

Geography
Roseville is located at  (39.805708, -82.075592).

Demographics

2010 census
As of the census of 2010, there were 1,852 people, 699 households, and 492 families living in the village. The racial makeup of the village was 97.5% White, 0.5% African American, 0.2% Native American, 0.2% Asian, 0.2% from other races, and 1.5% from two or more races. Hispanic or Latino of any race were 0.6% of the population.

There were 699 households, of which 42.1% had children under the age of 18 living with them, 43.6% were married couples living together, 20.2% had a female householder with no husband present, 6.6% had a male householder with no wife present, and 29.6% were non-families. 22.9% of all households were made up of individuals, and 8.3% had someone living alone who was 65 years of age or older. The average household size was 2.65 and the average family size was 3.05.

The median age in the village was 33.7 years. 29.2% of residents were under the age of 18; 8.4% were between the ages of 18 and 24; 27.1% were from 25 to 44; 23.6% were from 45 to 64; and 11.7% were 65 years of age or older. The gender makeup of the village was 48.5% male and 51.5% female.

2000 census
As of the census of 2000, there were 1,936 people, 729 households, and 529 families living in the village. The population density was 2,782.2 people per square mile (1,067.8/km). There were 803 housing units at an average density of 1,154.0 per square mile (442.9/km). The racial makeup of the village was 98.24% White, 0.31% African American, 0.31% Native American, and 1.14% from two or more races. Hispanic or Latino of any race were 0.36% of the population.

There were 729 households, out of which 42.1% had children under the age of 18 living with them, 50.9% were married couples living together, 16.3% had a female householder with no husband present, and 27.3% were non-families. 23.3% of all households were made up of individuals, and 11.4% had someone living alone who was 65 years of age or older. The average household size was 2.66 and the average family size was 3.11.

In the village, the population was spread out, with 30.7% under the age of 18, 11.0% from 18 to 24, 29.9% from 25 to 44, 17.2% from 45 to 64, and 11.2% who were 65 years of age or older. The median age was 30 years. For every 100 females there were 90.7 males. For every 100 females age 18 and over, there were 82.4 males.

The median income for a household in the village was $24,706, and the median income for a family was $26,964. Males had a median income of $26,250 versus $15,463 for females. The per capita income for the village was $12,707. About 22.3% of families and 27.6% of the population were below the poverty line, including 41.3% of those under age 18 and 7.4% of those age 65 or over.

Notable people
Dizzy Nutter, baseball player.
Ronald E. Rosser, Medal of Honor recipient.

References

External links

Villages in Muskingum County, Ohio
Villages in Perry County, Ohio
Villages in Ohio